Reth may refer to:

 Reth, a fictional city in the role-playing game setting of the Forgotten Realms
 Reth, North Brabant, a settlement in the Netherlands (51°26′N 4°57′E)
 Reth (TV series), a serial appearing on the Indian Zee TV satellite television network
 Captain Reth, fictional military figure in Second Battle of Borleias in the Star Wars Universe
 The title of the kings of the Shilluk people in southern Sudan